Judrėnai is a small town in Klaipėda County, in northwestern Lithuania. According to the 2011 census, the town has a population of 468 people.

References

Towns in Lithuania
Towns in Klaipėda County